Yaël Andrina Meier (born May 8, 2000) is a Swiss businesswoman, actress and journalist.

Early life and education 
Meier was born into a middle class family in Lucerne, Switzerland. Her father, Andreas Meier, is an account manager, her mother is a housewife of Italian descent. She primarily grew-up in Vitznau, where her family owns a home only steps away from Lake Lucerne. Meier did not pursue an academic degree and left school after completing her Matura. She has ever since worked in the fields of acting, journalism and has formed her own company with her partner.

Career 
Yaël Meier's first appearance in a feature film in 2015 was also her first leading role, in Tobias Ineichen's drama Upload. She played the role when she was 14 years old. According to her own statements, the acceptance came as a surprise, since she went to the casting "for fun". Since then she has acted in various cinema and television productions. Among other things, she was cast in Lisa Brühlmann's film Blue My Mind and Natascha Beller's comedy The Fertile Years Are Over for a major supporting role.

In addition to acting, Yaël Meier works in journalism. As part of her work from 2017 to 2020 as an editor at Blick, she owned a weekly column in Blick am Abend and a podcast format of the same name Yaël's Talk (discontinued in 2019). From 2017 to 2019 she also worked as a production assistant and actress for the YouTube format Zwei am Morge on Swiss radio and television. As a freelance journalist, Yaël Meier writes articles and commentaries for the Weltwoche and the Neue Zürcher Zeitung.

On February 4, 2020, Meier and her partner Jo Dietrich founded the agency ZEAM GmbH, an advertising and consulting agency specializing in Generation Z, which is primarily active in bringing companies closer to the current generation of consumers and employees and providing this group with a voice.

Personal life 
Meier is in a relationship with her business partner Jo Dietrich.

They have one son and live in Zurich. On January 10, 2023 she announced on her LinkedIn profile that she is pregnant with her second child, which also the media picked-up on.

Filmography 
Meier has been in film productions on a regular basis since 2015, when she was only 14 years of age. The films she starred in include; Upload (2015), Blue My Mind (2017), The Fertile Years Are Over (2019) and Advent Advent (2020, SRF).

References

External links

2000 births
Living people
Swiss businesspeople
Swiss actresses
Swiss journalists
People from Zürich